Margaret of Austria may refer to:

Margaret of Austria, Queen of Bohemia (c.1204–1266), titularly reigning Duchess of Austria & Styria, Queen consort of the Romans, Queen consort of Bohemia; married Henry II of Sicily and Ottokar II of Bohemia
Margaret of Austria, Margravine of Moravia (c.1346 – 14. January 1366), married John Henry of Moravia
Margarete of Austria (1395–1447), wife of Henry XVI, Duke of Bavaria
Margaret of Austria, Electress of Saxony (1416–1486), Habsburg princess, daughter of duke Ernest of Austria, married elector Frederick II of Saxony
Margaret of Austria, Duchess of Savoy (1480–1530), Governor of the Habsburg Netherlands, daughter of Maximilian I, Holy Roman Emperor and Mary of Burgundy, married John, Prince of Asturias and Philibert II, Duke of Savoy
Margaret of Parma (1522–1586), Governor of the Netherlands, daughter of Emperor Charles V, married Alessandro de' Medici & Ottavio Farnese
Archduchess Margaret of Austria (nun), daughter of Ferdinand I, Holy Roman Emperor and his wife Anne of Bohemia and Hungary
Archduchess Margaret of Austria (1567–1633), a member of the House of Habsburg 
Margaret of Austria, Queen of Spain (1584–1611), Queen of Spain, Portugal, Naples and Sicily, grandchild of emperor Ferdinand I, Holy Roman Emperor, married Philip III of Spain
Archduchess Margarete Sophie of Austria (1870–1902), a member of the House of Habsburg
Archduchess Margarethe Klementine of Austria (1870–1955), Princess of Thurn and Taxis, married Albert, 8th Prince of Thurn and Taxis
Archduchess Margaret of Austria (born 1925), member of the House of Habsburg-Lorraine